Annals of Clinical Biochemistry is a bimonthly peer-reviewed scientific journal covering all aspects of clinical biochemistry. The editor-in-chief is Michael J Murphy (University of Dundee). It was established 1960 and is published by SAGE Publications on behalf of The Association for Clinical Biochemistry and Laboratory Medicine.

Abstracting and indexing 

The journal is abstracted and indexed in:

According to the Journal Citation Reports, its 2012 impact factor is 1.922, ranking it 12th out of 31 journals in the category "Medical Laboratory Technology".

References

External links 

 

SAGE Publishing academic journals
English-language journals
Bimonthly journals
Laboratory medicine journals
Medicinal chemistry journals
Publications established in 1960